André Michel is a human rights and anti-corruption lawyer and opposition leader in Haiti. He has been involved in protests alleging corruption by various political leaders and has been involved in protests calling for the resignation of Haiti's president Jovenel Moïse. He was arrested in 2013. He has been a critic of Michel Martelly and his PHTK party. His arrest spurred a large protest.

Along with another lawyer he raised issues about former U.S. president Bill Clinton role with the U.N. in Haiti.

References

Year of birth missing (living people)
Living people
Haitian politicians
Human rights lawyers